Sofie Krehl (born 22 September 1995) is a German cross-country skier who represents the club SC Oberstdorf.

She competed at the FIS Nordic World Ski Championships 2017 in Lahti, Finland.

Cross-country skiing results
All results are sourced from the International Ski Federation (FIS).

Olympic Games

World Championships

World Cup

Season standings

References

External links

1995 births
Living people
German female cross-country skiers
Cross-country skiers at the 2022 Winter Olympics
Olympic cross-country skiers of Germany
Medalists at the 2022 Winter Olympics
Olympic silver medalists for Germany
Olympic medalists in cross-country skiing